Le Crocodile du Botswanga (Botswanga Crocodile) is a 2014 French comedy film directed by Lionel Steketee and Fabrice Eboué.

Cast
 Thomas N'Gijol – Capitaine Bobo
 Fabrice Éboué – Didier
 Ibrahim Koma – Leslie Konda 
 Claudia Tagbo – Maman Jacqueline
 Franck de la Personne – Monsieur Pierre
 Eriq Ebouaney – Lieutenant Yaya
 Étienne Chicot – Jacques Taucard
 Hélène Kuhn – Léa
 Issa Doumbia – Soldat Issa
 Amelle Chahbi – Karina
 Marc Ateba – Bobo Junior 
 Pascal N'Zonzi – The Minister for firms

References

External links
 

2010s French-language films
2014 films
French comedy films
Films directed by Lionel Steketee
Films directed by Fabrice Eboué
2014 comedy films
2010s French films